Hadda Ouakki (Berber: ⵃⴰⴷⴷⴰ ⵓⵄⴽⴽⵉ - ; born 1953 in Ait Ishaq, Khénifra Province) is a Moroccan singer in the genre of Tamawayt. Ouakki sings in Central Atlas Tamazight, and is described as one of the divas of the Amazigh music.

Biography
Hadda Ouakki was born in 1953 in a pious family in the middle Atlas village of Ait Ishaq. As a young child, she defied her parents by listening to villagers playing folk music, and by getting her face tattooed with blue markings. At the age of 14, her parents married her to a 70-year old man. The marriage failed, and at the age of 16, she escaped to Casablanca with the singer Bennacer Oukhouya. There she learned Arabic, and started to sing professionally in Oukhouya's band.

Gradually, Hadda's notability became to grow, and she founded her own group in 1981 with the singer Abdellah Zahraoui. Both performed several songs that became famous in Morocco in general, and the Middle Atlas region in particular.

References

1953 births
Berber musicians
Living people
People from Khenifra
20th-century Moroccan women singers
21st-century Moroccan women singers